Andrés Gil (born 27 January 1990 in San Isidro) is an Argentine actor, model, dancer and media personality.

Biography 
In January 2012 Gil took part - with Bobo Vieri, Alex Belli, Anna Tatangelo, Ria Antoniou, Ariadna Romero and other contestants - in the eighth season of the reality show Ballando con le Stelle hosted on Rai 1 by Milly Carlucci with Paolo Belli and his Big Band. In that game, Gil, with the professional dancer Anastasia Kuzmina, obtained the 1st place: in April 2012 the couple obtained the 3rd place in the race of champions named Ballando con te against some past champions of the past editions of Ballando con le Stelle.

In September 2012 Gil took part, with Kuzmina, in the first season of Pechino Express, the Italian version (aired on Rai 2 and hosted by Emanuele Filiberto di Savoia) of the international reality show Peking Express, and in that game this couple  obtained the 2nd place. Gil since 2014 took part as actor in Don Matteo and Che Dio ci aiuti, two of the most famous Italian fictions aired by Rai 1.

Filmography

Films

Television

References

1993 births
Living people
Argentine male actors
Argentine male models
Argentine male dancers
Argentine expatriates in Italy
People from San Isidro, Buenos Aires
Participants in Argentine reality television series
Reality show winners